Nové Sedlo may refer to places in the Czech Republic:

Nové Sedlo (Louny District), a municipality and village in the Ústí nad Labem Region
Nové Sedlo (Sokolov District), a town in the Karlovy Vary Region